Protector Shoal is a submarine volcano, also called seamount, which rises gently from an ocean depth of  to about  below sea level approximately  NW of Zavodovski Island in the South Sandwich Islands chain.  The last eruption occurred during March 1962. Protector Shoal is the only volcano in the arc that has erupted rhyolite pumice.

See also
List of volcanoes in South Sandwich Islands

References
 
 
 

Landforms of South Georgia and the South Sandwich Islands
Volcanoes of South Georgia and the South Sandwich Islands
Seamounts of the Atlantic Ocean
Former islands from the last glacial maximum